†Pleurodonte desidens was a species of air-breathing land snail, a terrestrial pulmonate gastropod mollusk in the family Pleurodontidae. This species was endemic to Martinique. It is now extinct.

References

Pleurodontidae
Extinct gastropods
Gastropods described in 1834
Taxonomy articles created by Polbot